Dharma Patni or Dharmapatni ( Wife) is a 1941 Indian Telugu-language drama film produced and directed by P. Pullayya under the Famous Films banner. It stars Santha Kumari, Bhanumathi, Uppuluri Hanumantha Rao and C. Hemalatha. The film marks the debut of Akkineni Nageswara Rao, who played a minor role as one of the ten school children in a song sequence, and also that of the writer Chakrapani.

The film was shot at Shalini Cinetone Studios, Kolhapur. Most of the technicians including cinematographer S. K. Pai, music director Annasaheb Mainkar, art director H. S. Gang Naik and editor Baburao Barodkar were from Maharashtra. The film was a commercial success.

Plot
Five-year-old Radha's dying mother hands the custody of Radha to the devadasi Sridevi, who promises henceforth she would lead a pure life. Sridevi teaches the child the virtues of a housewife. In the school, Radha befriends Mohan and as they grow, love blossoms between Radha and Mohan. Mohan takes her to the temple and pledges before the deity that she shall be his wife. The lecherous Ananda Rao informs Mohan's father that his son was seeing the daughter of a harlot Sridevi. Mohan's father forces his son to marry Uma from a rich family. Uma traces Mohan's disinterest in her to Radha and leaves him. Leela, a victim of Ananda Rao saves Uma from Rao's trap. Ananda Rao murders Leela and implicates Mohan. Radha, in order to save Mohan, decides to meet Ananda Rao, who assures her he had the evidence to prove Mohan's innocence. Finally, truth gets out and Mohan is saved from the gallows. His parents accept Radha. Uma realizes her folly and unites with Mohan.

Cast
 Bhanumathi as Uma
 Santha Kumari as Radha
 Uppaluri Hanumantha Rao as Mohan
 C. Hemalatha
 Rallabandi Kutumba Rao as Ananda Rao
 K. Lakshmi Narasimha Rao
 Achari
 Adinarayanayya as Mohan's father
 Peddapuram Raju as Sridevi
 Chalapathi Rao 
 Narimani 
 Susheela
 Master Kumar as Child Mohan
 Baby Lakshmi as Child Radha
 Akkineni Nageswara Rao

Crew
Art:  H. S. Gang Naik
Dialogues: Chakrapani
Lyrics: Balijepalli Lakshmikantham, Daita Gopalam
Playback: Bhanumathi Ramakrishna
Music: Timir Baran, Annasaheb Mainkar
Story: V. S. Khandekar
Editing: Baburao Barodkar
Cinematography: S. K. Pai
Presenter: Santha Kumari
Screenplay - Producer - Director: P. Pullayya
Banner: Famous Films
Release Date: 10 January 1941

Production

Development 
When P. Pullayya decided to make his first drama film, his friends from the Marathi film industry and his partner at Famous Films, Shiraz Ali suggested the works of popular Marathi writer Vishnu Sakharam Khandekar. Pullayya picked up Dharmapathni from Khandekar's stories and wrote a scenario.

Cast and crew 
Pullayya took his wife Santhakumari for the title role and after watching Vara Vikrayam (1939), he felt that Bhanumathi suited for the second heroine Uma's character, as Uma was as assertive and modern thinking like Bhanumathi’s character from Vara Vikrayam. For the male lead, Hanumantha Rao, son of popular stage actor Uppuluri Sanjeeva Rao was signed. He later acted two more movies, Bheeshma Pratigna and Vandemataram before settling down as a Municipal Health Officer in Bhimavaram. Dharmapathni also marked the debut of one of Telugu cinema's later day doyen Akkineni Nageswara Rao in a small role. Nageswara Rao's brother Ramabrahmam took him to Kolhapur hoping he would get the male lead's childhood character. Since Nageswara Rao was too old for the role, Pullayya signed him as one of the ten school children for the song sequence "Anandamayega mana Mohanudu".

Viswanatha Satyanarayana was initially signed to write the dialogues. But since they were too grammatical, Chakrapani, then already popular for his Telugu translations of Bengali writer Sarat Chandra Chatterjee's works, was hired. Most of the technicians were from Maharashtra  cinematographer S. K. Pai, music director Annasaheb Mainkar, art director H. S. Gang Naik and editor Baburao Barodkar.

Filming 
The film was shot at Shalini Cinetone Studios, Kolhapur.

Songs
Music was composed by Annasaheb Mainkar. Lyrics were written by Daita Gopalam.
 "Anuraagam Leka Anandamunda" (Lyrics: Daita Gopalam; Singer: P. Bhanumathi)
 "Nilu Niluma Neelavarnaa" (Lyrics: Balijepalli Lakshmikantham; Singer: P. Bhanumathi)

References

External links
 
 

1940s Telugu-language films
1941 films
Indian black-and-white films
Films directed by P. Pullayya
Indian drama films
1941 drama films
Films scored by Annasaheb Mainkar
Films scored by Timir Baran